The Boston Reds were a Major League Baseball franchise that played in the Players' League (PL) in 1890, and one season in the American Association (AA) in 1891. In both seasons, the Reds were their league's champion, making them the second team to win back-to-back championships in two different leagues. The first franchise to accomplish this feat was the Brooklyn Bridegrooms, who won the AA championship in 1889 and the National League (NL) championship in 1890. The Reds played their home games at the Congress Street Grounds.

The Reds were an instant success on the field and in the public's opinion.  The team signed several top-level players, and they played in a larger, more comfortable and modern ballpark than the Boston Beaneaters, the popular and well established cross-town rival. Player signings that first year included future Hall of Famers King Kelly, Dan Brouthers, and Charles Radbourn, along with other veterans such as Hardy Richardson, Matt Kilroy, Harry Stovey, and Tom Brown. The PL ended after one season, leaving most of its teams without a league.

After the dissolution of the PL, the AA voted to allow the Reds into the new combined league. This was based on the condition that all players be returned to their former clubs via the reserve clause.  Although the team's on-field captain, Kelly, became the player-manager for a new AA club, the Cincinnati Kelly's Killers, the Reds stayed intact by keeping several of their top players. Of the club's key players from the previous year's team, Brouthers, Richardson, and Brown were retained. To fill the void of the departing players, the team brought in future Hall of Famers Hugh Duffy and Clark Griffith, along with solid veterans Paul Radford, Charlie Buffinton, and George Haddock. When the 1891 season ended, the AA folded as well, leaving the NL as the sole major league, and the Reds were bought out by the surviving NL clubs.

Players

References
General
Foulds, Allen E. 2005. Boston's Ballparks & Arenas. UPNE. .
Nemec, David. Rucker, Mark. 2004. The Beer and Whisky League: The Illustrated History of the American Association—Baseball's Renegade Major League. Globe Pequot. .
Specific

External links
Franchise index at Baseball-Reference and Retrosheet

Major League Baseball all-time rosters